The 2021–22 Detroit Red Wings season was the 96th season for the National Hockey League (NHL) franchise that was established on September 25, 1926. It is the Red Wings' fifth season at Little Caesars Arena.

The Red Wings were eliminated from playoff contention for the sixth consecutive season on April 9, 2022.

Off-season
On June 30, 2021, the Red Wings hired Alex Tanguay as an assistant coach.

On July 18, 2021, the NHL released the full list of players protected in the 2021 NHL Expansion Draft.

On July 21, 2021, the Seattle Kraken selected defenseman Dennis Cholowski during their expansion draft.

Standings

Divisional standings

Conference standings

Schedule and results

Preseason

Regular season

Awards and honours

Awards

Milestones

Player statistics

Skaters

Goaltenders

†Denotes player spent time with another team before joining the Red Wings. Stats reflect time with the Red Wings only.
‡Denotes player was traded mid-season. Stats reflect time with the Red Wings only.
Bold/italics denotes franchise record.

Transactions
The Red Wings have been involved in the following transactions during the 2021–22 season.

Trades

Free agents

Contract terminations

Waivers

Signings

Draft picks

Below are the Detroit Red Wings' selections at the 2021 NHL Entry Draft, which will be held on July 23 and 24, 2021, virtually via video conference call from the NHL Network studios in Secaucus, New Jersey, due to the COVID-19 pandemic.

Notes:
 The Dallas Stars' first-round pick went to the Detroit Red Wings as the result of a trade on July 23, 2021, that sent a first-round pick in 2021, a second-round pick in 2021, and a fifth-round pick in 2021 in exchange for this pick.
 The Vegas Golden Knights' second-round pick went to the Detroit Red Wings as the result of a trade on July 24, 2021, that sent a second-round pick in 2021, and a fourth-round pick in 2021 in exchange for this pick.
 The Vegas Golden Knights' fourth-round pick went to the Detroit Red Wings as the result of a trade on July 24, 2021, that sent a fourth-round pick in 2021 in exchange for this pick.
 The Vegas Golden Knights' fifth-round pick went to the Detroit Red Wings as the result of a trade on July 24, 2021, that sent a fourth-round pick in 2021 in exchange for this pick.

References

Detroit Red Wings
Detroit Red Wings
Detroit Red Wings
Detroit Red Wings seasons